The Lawrence County School District is a public school district based in Monticello, Mississippi (USA). The district's boundaries parallel that of Lawrence County. The Lawrence County School District is under the administration of Tammy Fairburn.

There were a total of 2,322 students enrolled in the Lawrence County School District during the 2006–2007 school year.

Schools
Lawrence County High School (Grades 9-12)
Tawanna C. Thornton, Principal
Lawrence County IMPACT Center (Grades 5-12)
Carla Bell, Director
Lawrence County Technology & Career Center (Grades 9-12)
Darrel Turner, Director
Rod Paige Middle School (Grades 5-8)
Lenard King, Principal
Monticello Elementary School (Grades K-4)
Cynthia Carr Williamson, Principal
New Hebron Attendance Center (Grades K-8)
Ronnie Morgan, Principal
Topeka Tilton Attendance Center (Grades K-8)
John Bull, Principal

Demographics

2006-07 school year
There were a total of 2,322 students enrolled in the Lawrence County School District during the 2006–2007 school year. The gender makeup of the district was 49% female and 51% male. The racial makeup of the district was 42.33% African American, 56.20% White, 0.95% Hispanic, and 0.52% Asian. 55.7% of the district's students were eligible to receive free lunch.

Previous school years

Accountability statistics

See also
List of school districts in Mississippi

References

External links
 

Education in Lawrence County, Mississippi
School districts in Mississippi